Dean Ho may refer to:

Dean Ho (biomedical engineer), American bio-nano-technology professor
Dean Ho (wrestler), (stage name of Dean Higuchi), a professional American wrestler